Rifugio Elisabetta (or Rifugio Elisabetta Soldini Montanaro to give it its full, but less well-used name) is a refuge in the Italian Alps at an altitude of 2,195 m, which provides a convenient overnight stage for walkers undertaking the Tour du Mont Blanc. It is located 3 km north-east of the Col de la Seigne, at the south-west end of the Mont Blanc massif, and provides good views of Mont Blanc and the Aiguille Noire de Peuterey. Because of its popularity, plus the fact that there are no other huts along this part of the Tour du Mont Blanc, walkers are advised to book in advance during the peak periods in July and August.

The hut is named after the Italian hiker Elisabetta Soldini Montanaro, who died in an accident in the mountains.

References

External links
Rifugio Elisabetta website
Elisabetta Hut on summitpost.org
Location of Refugio Elisabetta on French IGN mapping portal

Mountain huts in the Alps
Mountain huts in Aosta Valley
Courmayeur